The Western Australian Herbarium is the State Herbarium in Perth, Western Australia.

It is part of the State government's Department of Parks and Wildlife, and has responsibility for the description and documentation of the flora of Western Australia.
It has the Index Herbariorum code of PERTH.

The Hebarium forms part of the Australasian Virtual Herbarium.

The Herbarium is linked to the Western Australian 'Regional Herbaria Network' – which links approximately 84 regional community groups which have local reference collections.

In 2000, with the Wildflower Society of Western Australia and the Botanic Gardens and Parks Authority it published The Western Australian Flora – A Descriptive Catalogue.

History
The Herbarium was formed as the amalgamation of three separate government department herbaria: those of the Western Australian Museum, the Department of Agriculture, and the "forest herbarium" maintained by the Conservator of Forests. The first of these was formed by Bernard Henry Woodward, Director of the Museum and Art Gallery, probably around 1895; the second was probably formed with the appointment of Alexander Morrison as botanist to the Department of Agriculture in 1897. In 1906 the Department of Agriculture handed its herbarium over to the Museum, but reclaimed it in 1911. The "forest herbarium" commenced in 1916. Around 1928, the Government took the decision to amalgamate the three into a single State Herbarium, to be managed by the Department of Agriculture. The "forest herbarium" was handed over more or less immediately, but the Museum was opposed to the merger, and did not finally hand over its specimens until around 1959. In 1988 departmental responsibility was shifted from the Department of Agriculture to the Department of Conservation and Land Management, the Department of Parks and Wildlife, and now the Department of Biodiversity, Conservation and Attractions.

Contributors 

Significant contributors include:

 Alex George

 Arthur Weston

See also
FloraBase – the Western Australian Flora

Publications

 Kingia
 Nuytsia (journal)

  Western Australian Herbarium Research Notes 1978-1986

References

External links
  Regional Herbaria Network information

Botany in Western Australia
Nature conservation in Western Australia
Herbaria in Australia
1928 establishments in Australia